Line 1 Yonge–University is a rapid transit line on the Toronto subway. It serves Toronto and the neighbouring city of Vaughan in Ontario, Canada. It opened as the "Yonge subway" in 1954 as Canada's first underground passenger rail line, and was extended multiple times between 1963 and 2017. Averaging over 850,000 riders per weekday, Line 1 is the busiest rapid transit line in Canada, and one of the busiest lines in North America.

Route description

This eastern portion, often just called the "Yonge Line", serves Downtown Toronto, Midtown Toronto and York Mills before ending at Finch Avenue, the northern edge of North York Centre.

At Spadina Avenue, it turns north to run for roughly  under Spadina Road before curving northwesterly to continue along the Nordheimer and Cedarvale ravines to the foot of Allen Road at Eglinton Avenue. It reaches the surface and continues northward in the road's median for  past Wilson Station, after which it moves underground again and runs northwesterly on an off-street alignment below suburban industrial areas and the York University campus until Steeles Avenue. From there, it turns to parallel Jane Street for roughly  until its northwestern terminus in the neighbouring city of Vaughan's planned downtown core, the Vaughan Metropolitan Centre, at the intersection of Jane Street and Highway 7. This western portion serves the Annex and Forest Hill neighbourhoods in Old Toronto; Humewood–Cedarvale in the former York; Glen Park, Downsview, the York University Heights–Northwood Park areas in the former North York; and the Vaughan Metropolitan Centre in Vaughan.

Name 
The line's name has been changed as it has been extended. Following its opening between Union Station and Eglinton Avenue along Yonge Street in 1954, it was called "the subway" (Yonge subway is its retronym). In 1963, it was extended along University Avenue to St. George station and renamed the "Yonge–University Line". Briefly in 1966, the Yonge–University subway ran in two branches: one west along Bloor to Keele station (Yonge–University–Bloor), the other east along Bloor and Danforth to Woodbine station (Yonge–University–Danforth) via Bay Lower station.

In 1978, the "Spadina" section was opened and the line became the "Yonge–University–Spadina Line" (YUS). Although only two stations are on Spadina Road, a larger portion of the line was originally intended to follow the planned Spadina Expressway, which was partially built as Allen Road. The subway also had an additional internal route number: route 602.

Unofficially, subway lines were already numbered, but in October 2013, the TTC announced plans to display line numbers publicly to help riders to navigate the system. In March 2014, the line was officially numbered and renamed "Line 1 Yonge–University", with the Spadina part being dropped from the name. Announcements, documentation and rapid transit maps across the system now refer to the line as "Line 1" or "Line 1 Yonge–University".

History

Early proposals
There were several early proposals to build a subway along or near Yonge Street, many of which involved running streetcars in a tunnel. Here are some of the proposals.
 In 1909, an English company offered to build and operate a subway along Yonge Street from Eglinton Avenue to Front Street. The plan was abandoned because the city would take over public transit in 1921, and the company's franchise would then terminate.
 In 1910, when running for mayor of Toronto, Horatio C. Hocken proposed building a "tube" along Yonge Street from north of St. Clair Avenue to Front Street. He dropped the idea after losing that election.
 In 1911, a city engineer planned a line from Bay and Front streets to Yonge Street and St. Clair Avenue. The electorate rejected the plan.
 In 1931, City Controller Hacker proposed a north–south subway running from Avenue Road and St. Clair Avenue south to Front and York streets, making a wide loop via Front, Scott, Victoria and Gerrard streets. The TTC rejected this proposal saying there was insufficient population to justify such a project.
 In 1942, the TTC proposed a north–south line under Bay Street from Union Station to Bloor Street then jogging over to Yonge Street to continue to north of St. Clair Avenue. This idea was rejected in favour of a subway completely along Yonge Street.

Construction

During World War II, workers travelling from their homes in "northern Toronto" (which would now be considered the downtown core) to the industrial areas to the east and west of the downtown area on Yonge seriously strained the existing road and streetcar networks. There was concern that the expected post-war boom in car ownership would choke the city with traffic. The scheme was first proposed by Toronto Transportation Commission in 1942 to relieve congestion, which was delaying their bus and tram services. The TTC formed a Rapid Transit Department and studied various solutions between 1942 and 1945.

A plan was put to the voters on January 1, 1946. The plan had two parts. First, it featured a "rapid transit subway" operated with subway trains from Eglinton Avenue to the north as far as College Street to the south. The line would continue directly under Yonge and Front Streets to Union Station. Second would be a "surface car subway", diverting streetcar services off Queen Street and Dundas Street. This would run mostly along Queen Street, with each end angling north to reach Dundas Street west of Trinity Park and Gerrard Street at Pape Avenue. The route would run directly under Queen Street from University Avenue to Church Street, with the rest off-street. The vote was overwhelmingly in favour, and Toronto City Council approved construction four months later.

The plebiscite contained the condition that the federal government would subsidize 20 percent of the project. The federal Minister of Reconstruction, C.D. Howe, promised federal support in an October 3, 1945, letter. However, the funding fell through over a disagreement about the details of the employment arrangements. A scaled down proposal, about 20 perent smaller, was agreed to in its place. The work along Queen Street was abandoned temporarily, and the original $42.3million ($ in ) was reduced to $28.9million ($ in ) plus $3.5million ($ in ) for rolling stock. After a two-year delay due to postwar labour shortages, construction on the new subway did not start until September 8, 1949. A roughed-in station was constructed below  station for a proposed Queen line, but that line was never built.

Service on the Yonge route would be handled by new rolling stock, and the TTC was particularly interested in the Chicago series 6000 cars, which used trucks, wheels, motors, and drive control technologies that had been developed and perfected on PCC streetcars. However, the United States was in the midst of the Korean War at the time, which had caused a substantial increase in metal prices, thus making the PCC cars too expensive for the TTC. Instead, in November 1951, an order was placed with the Gloucester Railway Carriage and Wagon Company in England for 104 cars for $7,800,000 ($ in ) including spare parts.
The Toronto Subway typeface and TTC logo were also designed during this period. The logo used during the subway's development was designed by mid-century architect John C. Parkin and chief architect Arthur Keith. Against the wishes of Walter Paterson, the chief engineer, TTC chairman William McBrien and general manager H.C. Patten rejected the design in favour of one that was more similar to the one previously used on TTC vehicles.

Opening

It was the first subway in Canada.

The original Yonge Street subway line went from Union subway station near the namesake railway station north to Eglinton station. Dignitaries, including the premier and the mayor, rode the first train that morning, going north from the yards at Davisville station, and then from Eglinton station south along the entire line. The line was then opened to the public, and that day at 2:30 pm, the last streetcar made its final trip along the Yonge streetcar line.

Operations and extensions from 1954 to 2017
The plan to operate two-car trains during off-peak hours was abandoned in favour of four-car trains, and six-car trains were standard during most periods, with some eight-car trains used during peak periods.

On February 28, 1963, an extension was added to curve north from Union Station, below University Avenue and Queen's Park to near Bloor Street, where it turned west to terminate at St. George and Bloor Street.

On February 26, 1966, the Bloor–Danforth line opened, from Keele to Woodbine. For six months, as a trial, the Yonge-University line operated as 2 branches, Eglinton-Keele, and Eglinton-Woodbine. The interline was determined not worthy, and the Yonge-University line was cut back to St. George on September 4, 1966.

On June 23, 1969, the University subway service from St. George to Union stations was discontinued entirely after 9:45 p.m. from Mondays to Saturdays and all day on Sundays and holidays. The 5B Avenue Road buses runs in place between Eglinton and Front Street whenever the University subway did not operate, with side-jaunts to St. George station to capture passengers from the Bloor subway. This arrangement remained in place until January 28, 1978, when the Spadina subway opened north to Wilson Station.

These two extensions were part of the North Yonge Extension project, bringing the subway to North York.

Stations were also planned for Glencairn (between Eglinton and Lawrence, though another Glencairn station would be built later on the Spadina section), Glen Echo (between Lawrence and York Mills) and Empress (between Sheppard and Finch, later opened as North York Centre station).

On January 27, 1978, the Spadina segment of the line was opened, going from St. George station, the north terminus of the University line, to Wilson station. From St. George station, the  segment ran north and northwest to Eglinton Avenue and William R. Allen Road, then north along the median of the Allen Road to Wilson Avenue. This extension had been proposed as part of the Spadina Expressway, but when the expressway portion south of Eglinton Avenue was cancelled after massive protests, the subway was still built following the route through Cedarvale Ravine.

On June 18, 1987, North York Centre station was added between Sheppard and Finch stations as an infill station.

On August 11, 1995, at 6:02 pm, the Russell Hill subway accident occurred as a southbound subway train heading toward Dupont station crashed under Russell Hill Drive, killing three passengers and sending 30 to hospital. This accident prompted the Toronto Transit Commission to review its practices and put resources into safety.

On March 31, 1996, the Spadina segment of the line was extended  from Wilson station north to Downsview station (renamed  in 2017). At the time, a newly elected provincial Progressive Conservative government cancelled its share of funding that would have extended this route northward to York University and Steeles Avenue. However, this extension was later constructed and opened on December 17, 2017. (See Toronto–York Spadina Subway Extension.)

As of November 17, 2016, with the Presto fare gates installed at Eglinton station, all of the stations along this line are Presto-enabled.

Toronto–York Spadina subway extension (TYSSE)

On December 17, 2017, an extension of the western portion of Line 1 from Sheppard West station northwest via York University to the Vaughan Metropolitan Centre at Jane Street and Highway 7 in Vaughan opened. The TYSSE was the first new section of a subway line to be opened since the opening of Line 4 Sheppard in 2002.

Approximately 2,900 new parking spaces were built at three stations along the extension in order to encourage commuters to use the subway system. Finch West station has 400 spaces, Pioneer Village station has 1,900 spaces, Highway 407 station has 600 spaces, and Vaughan Metropolitan Centre station has 900 spaces.

Background
A Spadina extension into Vaughan had been suggested as early as 1988, when Lorna Jackson campaigned during the Vaughan municipal elections to extend the subway system to the proposed Highway 407 corridor.

The preferred alignment and placement for four stations for the extension beyond Sheppard West Station to serve York University were finalized in September 2005.

Greg Sorbara, former deputy premier of Ontario and finance minister, was a key promoter of the TYSSE to the York University and into York Region, in which his riding was based. In his memoirs, he said that "it would not only be great for the people in the region, but also for my political prospects." In 2015, Sorbara indicated that, while David Miller was mayor of Toronto, Miller was initially not enthusiastic about the extension. Sorbara said, "He should have been thrilled at the prospect of the province providing $670million for more subway infrastructure, regardless of where it went."

Temporary busway
In 2003, a temporary busway was planned between Downsview (renamed Sheppard West in mid-2017) station and the campus, but was opposed by the university, which felt it would lessen government willingness to extend the subway. After numerous delays, construction on the York University Busway started on July 25, 2008, with a short section of the busway opened on September 6, 2009 and the remainder opened on November 20, 2009.

Extension construction
The estimated cost was $2.09billion in 2006, which have been escalated to $2.63billion considering costs at the year of occurrence. The Province of Ontario deposited $870million into the Move Ontario Trust. The federal government committed $697million, but only released $75million at the start of its fall 2006 election campaign. The City of Toronto and the Regional Municipality of York committed to fund one-third of total project costs, with Toronto contributing $526million and York Region contributing $352million.

The first construction contract was awarded on February 27, 2008. Construction commenced in July 2008 with the relocation of sewers.

The TTC purchased two tunnel boring machines in late 2010 from LOVAT Inc. (since acquired by Caterpillar Inc.) for $58.4million to dig tunnels on this extension, and two more boring machines were delivered in early 2011. Tunnel boring for the extension began on June 17, 2011 and was completed on November 8, 2013.

By 2015, the project had encountered several problems, such as frequently changing station design plans, project management problems resulting in the dismissal of two TTC managers, poor performance by some contractors, death of a worker at the York University station site and harsh winter weather.

After the extension was found to be over-budget in March 2015, the Toronto City Council approved an additional $150million in funding, with $90million from Toronto and $60million from York Region. The TTC subsequently signed a contract with Bechtel, worth up to $80million, to assume management of the extension. This bypassed the tendering process usually used to hire contractors.

During construction, costs grew from the original $2.6billion to about $3.2billion by January 2016.

Extension criticism
The extension north of Steeles Avenue was criticized in the press for several reasons. The TTC had intended to extend the subway as far as York University, with a vast bus terminal complex at the future Pioneer Village station. However, provincial funding required the line crossing the city limits. The area around Vaughan Metropolitan Centre station is occupied by big-box stores and highways, and lacks the dense development that surrounds most other subway stations. In addition, Highway 407 station was built within vacant land, across the street from Beechwood Cemetery and next to Black Creek.

During the proposal stage of the project, the TTC had concluded there were insufficient projected population densities to justify the line north of Steeles Avenue, with some of the new stations projected to be among those with the lowest ridership in the subway system.

Vaughan plans to use the subway extension to spur the development of a transit-oriented city centre at Vaughan Metropolitan Centre station. Vaughan Councillor Alan Shefman stated the new city centre will eventually create the density to justify a subway. To this end, Vaughan Mayor Maurizio Bevilacqua worked with a developer to build several high-rise buildings near Vaughan Metropolitan Centre station; however, as of December 2017, the area still mainly consisted of big box stores, low rise commercial buildings and parking lots. By 2023, however, several high-density residential towers were scheduled to be completed in the area. As a precedent, the Sheppard subway shows that while a subway may spur development, that development may not result into a high subway ridership. As columnist Royson James stated in the Toronto Star, commuter destinations may be scattered throughout the Greater Toronto Area where public transit is inconvenient to use.

Outgoing TTC CEO Andy Byford said: "People say '[build] there and they will come.' I think the most pressing need is to now focus on subway expansion where it's not so much that they will come, it's [that] there's already a demonstrable need." However, Globe and Mail columnists Oliver Moore and Jeff Gray wrote in the context of the TYSSE: "But that advice will have to compete with the growing power of the suburbs, and the eagerness of Queen's Park to court them." Toronto city councillor and TTC commissioner Glenn de Baeremaeker said: "Whether [the subway], quote, merits on a technical sense, the ridership or not, it's a philosophical decision the city has made and society has made. People like subways."

Operating costs
According to a TTC forecast reported by transit advocate Steve Munro in early 2015, the TTC's annual operating costs for the entire TYSSE would be $33.7million, or $14.2million net of revenue. This would produce a 58 percent cost recovery compared to 70 percent for the TTC system as a whole. These costs, including those for the portion in Vaughan, will be covered by the TTC and the City of Toronto. In 2016, the expected net cost to run the extension was revised to $30million.

According to a 2008 memo of understanding between York Region and the City of Toronto:
The TTC will be responsible for the full operating costs of the Spadina Subway extension from Downsview (renamed Sheppard West in May 2017) to the Vaughan Corporate Centre (renamed Vaughan Metropolitan Centre) and receive all revenue from the Project (passenger revenue, commuter parking, advertising, retail leasing), with the exception of the operating costs and revenues for bus terminals and passenger pickup and drop off facilities located within York Region, which shall be maintained and operated by York Region.

Fare policy within Vaughan

Although Highway 407 and Vaughan Metropolitan Centre stations are located in Vaughan (within York Region) outside Toronto city limits, regular Toronto TTC fares are charged when entering or exiting these stations to simplify fare collection. This practice is in contrast to TTC-operated bus routes that cross the Toronto–York boundary at Steeles Avenue, where a second fare is charged. However, an additional fare is required when transferring between the subway and connecting suburban transit service providers, such as York Region Transit, at these stations, as is the case when transferring to suburban transit services at stations within or bordering Toronto. 

This is similar to the policy in 1968, when five subway stations opened outside the pre-1998 Toronto city limits in what was the TTC's "Zone 2" area at the time but no extra Zone 2 fare was required to reach those stations, whereas extra fare was charged to connect with suburban TTC bus routes in the boroughs of Metropolitan Toronto.

Collector and legacy fare media phase-out

The TYSSE stations were among the first to eliminate staffed fare collector booths, along with the sales of TTC's legacy fare media productssuch as tokensin favour of the Presto card. As a result, these stations opened with roaming customer service attendants, although collector booths had been installed per station plans. Collector-booth closures at more stations along the west branch of the line, moving south from the TYSSE stations, followed later.

Ridership numbers
Early statistics published by CBC News report ridership numbers for three of six new stations on the TYSSE. In total, "57,100 riders boarded trains at the new stations during a week of service in May [2018]." Finch West station pulled the most riders for the month, with approximately 17,000 customers using the station daily (for comparison, Lawrence West and Lansdowne stations have similar usage). It is worth noting that these numbers were recorded during York University's strike, leading to fewer passengers at Pioneer Village and York University. Downsview Park and Highway 407 saw some of the worst ridership numbers in the entire subway system, with 2,000 daily customers at Downsview Park and 2,900 at Highway 407. Downsview Park now replaces Bessarion as the least used subway station on the TTC. Statistics in late 2018 showed that ridership at Downsview Park increased to 2,500 customers per day and Highway 407 increased to 3,400. The busiest station on the extension is now York University, which has about 34,100 daily customers. Finch West and Pioneer Village both serve approximately 17,000 customers and the terminus, Vaughan Metropolitan Centre, has a daily usage of 14,800. However, the average daily usage of all TTC subway stations is a little more than 34,000, which means that aside from York University station, all stations belonging to the extension are still seeing well below average usage.

Operations since 2017
On June 12, 2020, there was a near-collision south of Osgoode station with one train stopping within  of a passing train.

Future extensions
The Province of Ontario is leading the Yonge North Subway Extension, anticipated for implementation in 2030. York Region, in their 2022 Transportation Master Plan, propose further extensions of Line 1 on both the Spadina and Yonge legs. One proposal is to extend Line 1 along Jane Street from Vaughan Metropolitan Centre station north to Major Mackenzie Drive West (adjacent to Cortellucci Vaughan Hospital and Canada's Wonderland amusement park), with possible intermediate stations at Rutherford Road (adjacent to Vaughan Mills shopping mall) and Langstaff Road. The other proposal is to extend Line 1 along Yonge Street from the future High Tech station to Major Mackenzie Drive West (adjacent to Richmond Hill GO), with possible intermediate stations at Bantry Avenue and 16th Avenue). These plans are not currently funded and are slated for implementation to 2051 and beyond.

Design

Line 

The line is mostly underground but has several surface sections between Sheppard West and Eglinton West, and between Bloor–Yonge and Eglinton. Evidence of this can be seen in the tunnel: there are no columns or walls between tracks, and ballast and drainage ditches are present, something not seen in the rest of the subway system. There are also tree stumps and the stubs of lamp posts in the tunnel. There are also clues outdoors: seemingly unnecessary railings along the sides of a nearby street, which was once a bridge over the tracks, and empty lots following the trains' right-of-way marked with signs warning heavy vehicles and equipment to keep off because they might fall through to the columnless tunnel below.

Most of the tunnel was constructed by a cut-and-cover method, but some sections were bored, as noted below. All stations, whether by transfer or fare-paid terminal, connect to surface TTC bus and/or streetcar routes. Other surface and train connections are noted below.

Since 1996, TTC stations have been built or modified with elevators, ramps and other features to make them accessible to all. , 30 stations on the line are fully accessible. All stations on the line will be made accessible by 2025, as per the Accessibility for Ontarians with Disabilities Act.

Because the line opened in sections from 1954, it has a relatively high number of crossovers, which were mostly constructed at terminal stations to turn back trains. There are 17 diamond crossovers located between the service tracks along the length of the line. There are also eight storage tracks, which can also be used for reversals. The high number of possible turnbacks gives the TTC more flexibility when planning maintenance or in the event of an emergency service disruption.

Stations 

The original design of the oldest stations in the subway system, which are on the Yonge line (from Union to Eglinton), are mainly utilitarian and characterized by vitreous marble wall tiles and the use of the Toronto Subway font for station names. Eglinton Station is the only station to retain this wall treatment, though Queen Station retains a narrow band of original blue Vitrolite tiles near the ceiling at platform level.

The design of the stations on the University line was mainly utilitarian and this style (sometimes referred to as "bathroom modern") was later used for Line 2 Bloor–Danforth as well.  and  stations have circular and semi-circular cross-sections because they are constructed in bored tunnels. Museum station was renovated to have columns that resemble artifacts found in the nearby Royal Ontario Museum.

,  (formerly Sheppard), and Finch stations are similar to each other in design, but have different colour schemes: Lawrence is red and cream, Sheppard is yellow and dark blue, and Finch is light grey, medium grey, and dark grey. York Mills station formerly followed the same design scheme—in light green and dark green—until it was renovated.

The section of the line between Spadina and Wilson stations (formerly the Spadina segment) has art and architecture that is unique for each station, such as flower murals in Dupont station or streetcar murals in Eglinton West station. Since late 2017, work is underway to restore the art in both stations, with Glencairn's being fully re-installed in 2020.

North York Centre station is an infill station. Its design is different from the other stations in the earlier North Yonge extension. Sheppard West station, which was opened in 1996 as Downsview station, has art and architecture that is different from the earlier Spadina (later University) line stations.

Stations along the University line extension north from Sheppard West to Vaughan Metropolitan Centre, in keeping with the pattern of the rest of the former Spadina line, also feature public art and architecture from notable creators. However, the platform walls have no tiles or other cladding and are simply bare concrete, though structural elements on the platforms themselves are clad, as is the case with much of the Line 4 Sheppard stations.

Names and terminal designation
On the Yonge portion of the line, nearly all stations located at cross streets are named after said streets, while on the University portion, they are either named for local landmarks with the cross street subtitled below (e.g.  – ) or after cross streets but with a "West" suffix for stations at streets that have counterparts along Yonge, though Dundas West station is on Line 2 Bloor–Danforth. The pattern of using landmarks as station names was exclusively used on the original (southern) section of the University branch, and the West designated street-naming convention is typically used on the former Spadina (northern) section. The two interchange stations on the University branch where it intersects Line 2 Bloor–Danforth are named  and  after the north–south cross streets of Line 2, which runs below Line 1 between these stations.

Southbound station platform signage on both branches indicates  as a terminal station due to it being located at the southernmost point of the line's rough 'U' shape, where it turns northward when travelling along either branch. The train destination signs display the northwestern terminal station as "Vaughan" rather than its full name, Vaughan Metropolitan Centre, for brevity. Until the 1990s, train destination signs read "VIA DOWNTOWN" after the terminal station name.

Service

Operation hours and frequency 
As with other TTC subway lines, Line 1 operates most of the day and is generally closed between 2:00 a.m. and 6:00 a.m. EST on weekdays and Saturdays, and between 2 a.m. to 8 a.m. on Sunday. Trains arrive at stations every 2 to 3 minutes during peak periods and every 4 to 5 minutes during off-peak periods. 

During the morning peak, from 6:00 am to 9:00 am Monday to Friday, half the trains are turned back at Glencairn station resulting in limited service north of that point. The turnback was moved from St. Clair West station to Glencairn station in 2016, and plans called for it to be moved further to Pioneer Village station in December 2017 when the Line 1 extension opened.

Overnight service on the Yonge segment of the line is provided by 320 Yonge Blue Night from Queens Quay to Steeles Avenue with headways of 3 to 15 minutes. The University segment does not have an overnight service.

Rolling stock 

Line 1 is operated using only the TTC's Toronto Rocket (TR) subway trains, which are based on Bombardier's Movia family of trains. Unlike other trains in the Toronto subway rolling stock, the TR trains have a "six-car fixed" articulated configuration with full-open gangways, allowing passengers to walk freely from one end to the other. The TR trains were scheduled for delivery starting between late 2009 and early 2010, but was delayed until late 2010 due to production problems. They entered revenue service on this line on July 21, 2011, replacing the older H5 and the T1 series trains, which had been used on this line. (The T1 series trains, which used to operate on this line from 1995 until 2015, were transferred over to Line 2 Bloor–Danforth where they replaced the older H4 and H6 series trains).

From the line's opening in 1954 until 1990, it was operated with G-series cars, and was also served with a mix of M1 and H1/H2/H4 subway cars between 1965 and 1999.

One-person train operation 
Between 2021 and 2022, the TTC transitioned its Line 1 trains to one-person train operation (OPTO), which removes the secondary guard member – stationed at the rear end of the trains – who operated the doors. This change leaves only the subway drivers at the front to play the dual role of both driving the train and operating the doors. OPTO was already in place on Line 3 Scarborough and Line 4 Sheppard. OPTO went into effect between St. George and Vaughan Metropolitan Centre stations in November 2021, and was rolled out on the rest of the line effective November 20, 2022.

Gap trains 
Gap trains are empty trains stored on pocket tracks and brought into service in a gap between full-route trains to relieve overcrowding. The TTC observed that one empty gap train can clear a crowded platform at Bloor–Yonge.

The TTC had previously run gap trains prior to late 2017 but had discontinued the practice because of a "change in operating philosophy". The practice was reinstated in response to a potentially dangerous overcrowding incident that occurred at Bloor–Yonge in January 2018.

In October 2018, the TTC used three gap trains, which sat on pocket tracks near ,  and  stations and moved into southbound service when station over-crowding was detected.

Gap trains can also increase the capacity of Line 1, which often runs above its scheduled capacity of 28,000 passengers per hour. To address that demand, the TTC normally runs an average of 25.5 trains per hour through Bloor–Yonge and St. George stations in the morning peak period. With three gap trains, it can run up to 28 trains per hour.

Automatic train control

The TTC converted its block signal system to automatic train control (ATC) on Line 1 Yonge–University at a cost of $562.3million. With ATC, the TTC will be able to reduce the headway between trains on Line 1 from 2 minutes and 30 seconds to 2 minutes during rush hours, and allow a 25 percent increase in the number of trains operating on Line 1. ATC was introduced to Line 1 in phases.

There were delays on the project. Deadlines for the complete conversion of Line 1 were pushed back to 2016, then to 2018, to 2019,
and finally to 2022. ATC conversion was completed to Finch station on September 24, 2022. 

On November 4, 2017, the TTC successfully completed a 13-day test of ATC with trains using it in regular service between Dupont and Yorkdale stations. At the conclusion of the test, the feature was turned off between these two stations to allow installation of ATC through the interchange special work at the Wilson Yard. ATC was permanently extended south to Dupont station on December 3, 2018; to St. Patrick station on May 12, 2019; to Queen station on February 24, 2020; to Rosedale station on November 21, 2020, to Eglinton station in October 2021, and finally to Finch station on September 24, 2022. However, there will be a phase 6 for fixes, improvements and enhancements to be completed by the second quarter of 2023.

Prior to September 2022, ATC was operating on 79 percent of Line 1, and the partial implementation of ATC had resulted in improvements. Trains travel between Vaughan Metropolitan Centre and Rosedale stations 3.5 minutes faster. Just prior to 2020, ATC allowed for an 8 percent increase in trains per hour, and the number of trains scheduled in southbound service in the morning peak at Bloor–Yonge station increased from 22 to 25.5 trains per hour. Signal violations decreased by approximately 50 percent from 2017 to 2020.

Converting all of Line 1 to ATC required the installation of 2,000 beacons, 256 signals, and more than one million feet of cable.

, the timetable for ATC conversion on Line 1 is:

Yonge North expansion plan

The Yonge North subway extension is a Metrolinx proposal to extend the Yonge Street portion of Line 1 north of Finch Station to Richmond Hill in York Region. As of 2021, the project entails building two underground stations plus two surface stations north of Finch station. One of the underground stations will be at Steeles Avenue, with the other located at Clark Avenue. From south of Highway 7, the extension would veer east away from Yonge Street, rising to the surface and then turning north along GO Transit's Richmond Hill line. The two northernmost stationsone between Highway 7 and Highway 407 (dubbed "Bridge station" by Metrolinx) and another  further north at High Tech Roadwould be built on the surface along the railway corridor. Bridge station would also be a hub for Viva and GO Transit buses as well as being connected to the existing Langstaff GO Station. The estimated cost of the  extension is $5.6billion.

Originally, prior to 2021, the extension was to have had five new stops, all underground, located at Cummer/Drewry, Steeles, Clark, Langstaff/Longbridge and the Richmond Hill Centre Terminal of Viva bus rapid transit. In May 2017, the originally proposed  extension would have cost $5.6billion. However, by 2021, the cost of this version of the extension had risen to $9.3billion, resulting in a reduction of its scope.

The extension was projected to take a decade to build and would have replaced many of the 2,500 buses per day that run along the route. Ridership on the proposed extension was estimated at 165,000 per day. York Region estimated that the extension would help to create 31,000 jobs, and that the extension would carry 58million riders annually by 2031.

Plan history
On June 15, 2007, the Ontario government announced plans to fund this extension as part of a network of rapid transit growth called MoveOntario 2020.

In April 2009, the environmental assessment for the Yonge North subway extension was approved.

In November 2014, an addendum to the environmental assessment was approved to include an underground train storage facility and surface facilities.

By 2016, the province had committed to fund 15 per cent of the preliminary engineering and design for the project.

On June 2, 2016, the provincial government gave $55million to Metrolinx in order to work with the TTC and York Region on a detailed plan for the subway extension.

In May 2017, Toronto mayor John Tory announced he would not support planning for the Yonge North subway extension unless there was a funding commitment for the Relief Line to relieve crowding on Line 1, expected to be at capacity by 2031. If such a funding commitment had been authorized, city staff could have completed 15 to 30 percent of the design for both projects, including schedules and better estimates, by the end of 2019. As of May 2017, planning was more advanced for the Yonge extension than for the Relief Line, though the latter has since been replaced with the Ontario Line under the premiership of Doug Ford.

By March 2021, Metrolinx had reduced the scope of the project in order to reduce the estimated project cost from $9.3billion to $5.6billion. The number of stations was reduced from six underground stations to two underground stations plus two surface stations. Two of the three originally proposed underground stations at Cummer Avenue, Clark Avenue and Royal Orchard Boulevard would be eliminated, saving $400 to $500million per station, with only the station at Steeles Avenue being retained. The two northernmost stations, Langstaff/Longbridge and Richmond Hill Centre, would be replaced by the surface Bridge and High Tech stations. As well, the storage yard at the north end of the line would be built on the surface rather than underground. Markham City Council voted to reject this new route realignment including all surface portions of the route. This in effect cancelled the route option that the city council voted against. In July 2021 and January 2022 respectively, the province announced that the stations at Clark Avenue and Royal Orchard Boulevard would be retained; Royal Orchard was to be funded by revenues related to the intensification of the surrounding area as a transit-oriented community.

Capacity constraints
Toronto council approved the plan in principle in January 2009 provided there were upgrades to the existing line to support the additional ridership from York Region. Specifically, Toronto politicians say that the Yonge line does not have the capacity to support an extension to Richmond Hill until a separate relief line is built between Pape and Osgoode stations. In the morning rush hours, southbound trains on the Yonge line usually reach capacity between York Mills and Eglinton stations. In March 2016, the mayor's office said that SmartTrack and automatic train control may also be required.

In March 2016, York Region officials said that SmartTrack, electrified GO service, the Spadina subway extension and automatic train control will be implemented within a decade, and that these would be sufficient to support the extra ridership of an extension to Richmond Hill. Thus, the deputy mayor of Richmond Hill wanted to start construction of the extension by 2019. Vaughan politicians and officials are basing their case on a Metrolinx report from June 2015. The report indicates the Yonge line would have a capacity of 36,000 passengers per hour per direction (pphpd) in 2021 with automatic train control. Demand is 31,200 pphpd in 2015 plus 6,600 growth by 2031 plus 2,400 for the extension north of Steeles giving a total demand of 40,200 pphpd. The TYSSE would divert 1,300 pphpd and Regional Express Rail would divert another 4,200 leaving a demand of 34,700 pphpd and 1,300 pphpd in excess capacity. (However, as of April 2016, Metrolinx has no immediate plans to provide electrified GO service on the Richmond Hill line.) Toronto transit advocate Steve Munro says that, given the Metrolinx analysis, the line would be at 96 percent capacity in the peak hour and, because this is the peak hour average, there would be some overcrowding due to variations over the hour.

In June 2016, TTC spokesperson Brad Ross said that the ridership on the Yonge line is regularly 24,000 passengers per hour during the morning rush hours, approaching the line's capacity of 25,500. Automatic train control would increase the line's capacity to over 32,000 riders per hour but that would still not be enough to support the increased ridership from the extension. The TTC would need the completion of the relief line and SmartTrack in order to support the extra riders from York Region. (Note that the TTC and the Metrolinx report disagree as to the estimated capacity of the Yonge line after the implementation of automatic train control.)

In January 2019, Metrolinx reported that the Relief Line must be completed before opening the Yonge North Extension, thus reversing its opinion in its June 2015 report. The 2019 report also predicted that if both phase 1 of the Relief Line (between Pape station and downtown) and the Yonge North Extension were built, Line 1 would be over capacity by 2041. At that point, phase 2 of the Relief Line (north to Sheppard Avenue) would be required.

Plan criticism
GO Transit's long-term plan also calls for all-day service on its Richmond Hill line that would run express trains every 15 minutes between its Langstaff Station adjacent to the Richmond Hill Centre terminal, and Union Station in downtown Toronto, calling into question the additional need for a subway extension. As of April 2016, Metrolinx had no plans to electrify the Richmond Hill line, which would require $1billion for flood mitigation. Planned service improvements are every 15–30 minutes but only in the peak period.

Busway

Given the wait for the Richmond Hill extension, there were plans to have Viva Bus Rapid Transit bus lanes along Yonge Street from Finch Avenue to Highway 7. However, by April 2014, the plans were revised to run the busway from Highway 7 (at the proposed terminus of the North Yonge subway extension) north to Newmarket with some portions of the route operating in mixed traffic through Richmond Hill. The revised busway was opened in 2020.

A local group in York Region was lobbying for the cancellation of the planned busway along this route, which would have been a part of York Region's Viva bus rapid transit. The group was concerned about a loss of treed boulevards and private property when widening Yonge Street for bus lanes through Thornhill south of Highway 7.

See also
MoveOntario 2020
Yonge streetcar line – Predecessor to the Yonge portion of Line 1

Notes

References

External links

Yonge–University Line at Toronto Transit Commission
Toronto–York Spadina Subway Extension
Yonge North Subway Extension at Metrolinx
Yonge North Subway Extension at York Region Transit

1
Railway lines opened in 1954
4 ft 10⅞ in gauge railways
Railway lines in highway medians
Rapid transit lines in Canada
1954 establishments in Ontario